Eantis is a genus of skippers in the family Hesperiidae.

Species
Recognised species in the genus Eantis include:
 Eantis minna Evans, 1953
 Eantis minor Comstock, 1944
 Eantis mithridates (Fabricius, 1793)
 Eantis munroei Bell, 1956
 Eantis pallida (R. Felder, 1869)
 Eantis tamenund Edwards, 1871
 Eantis thraso Hübner, [1807]
 Eantis tosta (Evans, 1953)

References 

Natural History Museum Lepidoptera genus database

Pyrginae
Hesperiidae genera